Lazimpat is a residential area of Kathmandu, the capital city of Nepal. It is close to the Narayanhity Palace, and is well known in Kathmandu for its hotels, restaurants, schools, colleges, embassies and department stores. The neighborhood's name derives from Lazimpat Durbar, that lies in its vicinity and was converted into Hotel Shanker.

Lazimpat shares one border with Thamel, a popular tourist hub, and another with Baluwatar, a reputed residential area where the Prime Minister, Chief Justice, and the Chairman of Constitution Assembly reside. Lazimpat is just 20 minutes away from what is downtown of Kathmandu, Newroad and Ason.

There has been a recent upsurge in the construction activity in the region. Lazimpat boasts the only road connecting the northern part of the Kathmandu valley with the southern part. The roads are very busy, yet until a few years back, there was not much economic activity in the region. Luxury hotels, photo studios, department stores and corner shops have been a special feature of Lazimpat. It is centrally located and is also home to or nearby various embassies.. Sarashwoti Mandir, Dayashwor Mahadev mandir are situated in the lazimpat.

There are many hotels, such as Hotel Shanker and Radisson Hotel Nepal, restaurants and sweet shops situated in Lazimpat among various shopping outlets.

Embassies & Diplomatic Missions in Lazimpat include the Indian Embassy, the British Embassy, the Israeli Embassy, the French Embassy and the Delegation of the European Union to Nepal and also some Nepalese governmental offices, such as the Inland Revenue Department have their premises in the neighborhood.

The following organisations have their headquarters in Lazimpat:

Transportation
Busses of Sajha Yatayat serve Lazimpat. Other private Bus companies also stop at several points in the neighborhood.

References

Neighbourhoods in Kathmandu